Goodbye, Petrushka is a 2022 American romantic comedy film directed by Nicola Rose, starring Lizzie Kehoe, Thomas Vieljeux and Casey Landman. Written by Rose and produced by Rose and Tierney Boorboor, it explores the themes of art, love, and growing up through the characters of Claire, a young American puppeteer at the start of her career; and Thibaut, a French figure skater at the end of his. They meet in New York, then again in Paris, and affect each other's lives in unexpected ways.

Goodbye, Petrushka was Rose's first feature film. It premiered at the Dances With Films festival in Los Angeles in June 2022, and went on to win Best Feature at the Milledgeville-Eatonton Film Festival, Broad Humor Film Festival and others.

Plot summary
Claire (Lizzie Kehoe) is an American university student in New York City. Unhappy at college, and antagonized by egomaniac Professor Steve (Dhane Ross), she dreams of instead becoming a puppeteer in France. In her spare time, she makes puppets in her dorm room and fantasizes about dropping everything to pursue her dreams in Paris.

Thibaut (Thomas Vieljeux) is a competitive figure skater from France, but also temporarily in New York for his training. Newly forced into an early retirement and falling into a depression, he takes a job at a bank in Paris and tries to push away memories of his days on the ice.

Claire's loony yet wise best friend, Julia (Casey Landman), convinces Claire to take a break from college and live her dream of moving to Paris. Shortly after taking a job as a jeune fille au pair for a Parisian family, Claire meets Thibaut by chance on a New York street. Learning of his past as a skater, she falls quickly in love with him, or at least videos and images of him.

In Paris (where Julia has accompanied her), Claire juggles nannying for an increasingly creepy family, the St. Pierres, and trying to make a film about a local puppetry conservatory. In the latter, she is forestalled at every turn by The Bureaucrat (Joëlle Haddad-Champeyroux), an officious woman who works at the conservatory and seemingly everywhere else in Paris.

Meanwhile, Claire also reconnects with Thibaut, and the two are strongly drawn to one another. However, it turns out Thibaut is in a relationship with Trina (Cat Grey), a ballet dancer. And Claire winds up dating Rafał (Bartek Szymanski), an awkward Polish student at the puppetry conservatory.

Claire and Thibaut decide to work together on an ice adaptation of Igor Stravinsky’s ballet Petrushka, combining figure skating and puppetry. As they work together, their friendship deepens and becomes more complex. They fantasize about each other, imagining themselves as pairs skaters in various romantic and musical situations (set to animated sequences by Tommy Cha). But neither dares admit their feelings.

Soon, Claire's nannying job implodes, and she is forced to move in with Julia. She goes into business as a freelance puppeteer, performing at children's birthday parties, which turns out to be an often demoralizing task. Meanwhile, after she sleeps with Rafał for the first time – and her first time ever – he gradually reveals himself to be manipulative and controlling. Claire's life in Paris begins to unravel.

The final blow arrives when Thibaut, goaded by a jealous Trina, tells Claire he can't perform Petrushka with her after all. Desperate, Claire tries to force him into performing by signing them up for a puppetry performance festival without his knowledge. But her plan backfires; Thibaut gets angry with her and the two have a falling-out.

Soon after Claire's friendship with Thibaut collapses, so does her relationship with Rafał, then her fledgling puppetry career. Reaching breaking point, she resolves to go home to the United States, but not before enjoying a cathartic ritual of throwing all her puppets off her roof into the Seine, to get her anger and pain off her chest. She is joined by Julia, who has nothing to get off her chest, but just wants to throw things for fun.

Having figured on never seeing Thibaut again, Claire instead runs into him by chance on the day she is due to leave France. The two attempt to reconcile, with Thibaut doing his best to tell Claire how he feels about her – until the two are interrupted by the arrival of Claire's taxi to the airport.

In an epilogue set a few years later, we find Claire back in New York. We learn along with her what became of Thibaut since their goodbye, and she comes to her own conclusions about her present and future.

Cast
 Lizzie Kehoe as Claire
 Thomas Vieljeux as Thibaut
 Casey Landman as Julia
 Bartek Szymanski as Rafał
 Cat Grey as Trina
 Joëlle Haddad-Champeyroux as The Bureaucrat
 Dhane Ross as Professor Steve
 Matej Silecky as Ice Skater

Release
The film premiered at the Dances With Films Film Festival on June 12, 2022.

Reception
Stephanie Archer of Film Inquiry wrote that the film "navigates the turbulent experience of challenging reality with ambition, pushing past the naysayers to deliver something one can be proud of."

Alan Ng of Film Threat gave the film a score of 7 out of 10 and called it a "heartfelt narrative", writing that it is "not a perfect film, but it’s a very personal one."

Elias Savada of Film International wrote that "Rose’s world offers few other passersby in any of its worldly settings, so you’re pushed to accept Goodbye, Petrushka in its own microcosm."

Julie Musbach of FF2 Media called Goodbye, Petrushka "an enjoyable and touching watch," writing, "There is no villain. There is no grand heartbreak. It’s a soft spoken, uniquely told tale of a girl trying to find her way."

References

External links
 
 
 Goodbye, Petrushka at Amazon Prime Video

American romantic comedy films
2022 romantic comedy films
American multilingual films
2022 multilingual films
2022 comedy films